Charles Alston (1907–1977) was an American artist.

Charles Alston may also refer to:

Charles Alston (botanist) (1683–1760), Scottish botanist
Charles Alston (gridiron football) (born 1978), American football player